Lynk & Co is a Chinese-Swedish automobile brand owned by Geely Automobile Holdings. Founded in Gothenburg, Sweden, in 2016, the focus of the brand is on internet connectivity, innovative purchasing models and targets a young professional demographic.

Models
Lynk & Co has announced three models intended for production, all based on the Compact Modular Architecture (CMA) platform developed by CEVT and used also by Volvo. The first product announced by Lynk & Co was the crossover 01, the production version first shown at the 2017 Auto Shanghai show. Production of the 01 began first in China in 2017. A concept of the second model, the 03 sedan, was first shown along with the production 01 in Shanghai. The third model, also based on the platform shared with the Volvo XC40, is the 02. Smaller than the 01, it is also a crossover.

Current models are as follows:

 Lynk & Co 01 (2017–present), a compact SUV
 Lynk & Co 02 (2018–present), a compact hatchback and a compact crossover SUV
 Lynk & Co 03 (2018–present), a compact sedan
 Lynk & Co 04 (2020–present), an electric scooter launched with the 06, in conjunction with Ninebot
 Lynk & Co 05 (2019–present), a compact Coupe SUV based on the 01
 Lynk & Co 06 (2020–present), a subcompact SUV
 Lynk & Co 07 , a rumored compact 7-seater SUV
 Lynk & Co 09 (2021–present), a mid-size SUV

Lynk & Co had originally planned to launch the Lynk & Co 04 as a compact hatchback — however by 2020 it was cancelled and the nameplate was devoted to an electric scooter instead.

Sales 
Lynk & Co uses a direct-to-consumer sales model in most markets, in contrast to the traditional dealership model, and influenced by Tesla which has had success doing direct sales. Each car is ordered directly by the buyer and customized using equipment packages, either online or via a retail outlet.

The brand opened 221 retail outlets in China as of 2019, and expanded to Europe in 2020.

Lynk & Co also offers a subscription based service to customers.

Lynk & Co reported sales of 120,414 vehicles in China for 2018, the first full year the brand was on the market.

Gallery

See also

 Zeekr

References

External links
 Official Site

Joint ventures
Car brands
Geely divisions and subsidiaries
Geely brands
Car manufacturers of China
Car manufacturers of Sweden
Chinese brands
Luxury motor vehicle manufacturers
Swedish brands
Volvo Cars
Chinese companies established in 2016
Vehicle manufacturing companies established in 2016
Swedish companies established in 2016
Manufacturing companies based in Gothenburg